The 2020 New York Excelsior season was the third season of New York Excelsior's (NYXL) existence in the Overwatch League and their first under head coach Jeong "imt" Yong-cheol. New York planned to host two homestand weekends in the 2020 season at the Hammerstein Ballroom in the Manhattan Center. While the first homestand took place, all other homestand events were canceled due to the COVID-19 pandemic.

Preceding offseason

Organizational changes 
On October 21, 2019, New York parted ways with head coach Ty "Pavane" Hyun-sang, as he joined the London Spitfire as an assistant coach. Pavane had been with the team since its inception and led them to a 56–12 regular season record over his career with the team. In his replacement, New York promoted assistant coach Jeong "imt" Yong-cheol as their new head coach on November 19. On December 1, NYXL signed former Seoul Dynasty assistant coach Lee "WhyNot" Ju-hyub as an assistant coach.

Roster changes 
The Excelsior enter the new season with one free agents, one players which they have the option to retain for another year, and seven players under contract. The OWL's deadline to exercise a team option is November 11, after which any players not retained will become a free agent. Free agency officially began on October 7.

Acquisitions 
NYXL's first offseason acquisition was on February 15, when the team announced the signing of former Guangzhou Charge off-tank Choi "HOTBA" Hong-jun. The following week, the team promoted off-tank Kim "BiaNcA" Dong-wook from their academy team, XL2 Academy. On November 26, New York signed support player Kim "Mandu" Chan-hee from Korean Contenders team O2 Blast. The following week, on December 4, the team signed DPS player Lee "WhoRU" Seung-joon from Fusion University.

Departures 
On October 8, the Excelsior announced that they would not pick up their option to keep DPS Yeon-Oh "Fl0w3r" Hwang on the roster another year. A week later, the team announced that they would not re-sign off-tank Kim "MekO" Tae Hong, who had been with the team since their inception in 2017. On December 6, the team announced that DPS player Kim "Pine" Do-hyeon had retired from professional Overwatch and would become a streamer for NYXL.

Roster

Standings

Game log

Regular season

Midseason tournaments 

| style="text-align:center;" | Bonus wins awarded: 3

Postseason

References 

New York Excelsior
New York Excelsior
New York Excelsior seasons